Bruce McCarty, FAIA (December 28, 1920 – January 5, 2013) was an American architect, founder and senior designer (retired 2010) at McCarty Holsaple McCarty Architects of Knoxville, Tennessee.  During a career that has spanned more than a half-century, he designed some of the city's iconic landmarks, and was the city's most dedicated champion of Modern architecture. Buildings designed or co-designed by McCarty include the Lawson McGhee Library, Knoxville City County Building, University of Tennessee Humanities Complex, Clarence Brown Theatre, and University of Tennessee Art and Architecture Building.  McCarty was also the Master Architect for the 1982 World's Fair.

Biography

Early life
McCarty was born in South Bend, Indiana, the third of four sons to Earl H. and Hazel B. McCarty. Bruce McCarty was raised in Kenosha and Lake Geneva, Wisconsin. Earl McCarty was president of the Nash Motor Company during the 1930s.

McCarty attended Princeton University in the early 1940s, where he studied sculpture under noted sculptor and boxer, Joe Brown.  Following the outbreak of World War II, he left Princeton and joined the US Army Air Force. He first arrived in Knoxville for military training in 1943, and was later stationed in California as a P-38 pilot. On April 5, 1945 McCarty married Julia Elizabeth Hayes of Knoxville in Santa Rosa, California.  They have three children; Bruce Hayes McCarty, Sarah Elizabeth McCarty, and Douglas Hayes McCarty.

Career

Following the war, McCarty worked as a draftsman at the Knoxville architectural firm, Barber & McMurry.  He earned a BA from Princeton upon returning from the war in 1946.  From 1947 to 1949, McCarty attended the University of Michigan and earned a Bachelor of Architecture Degree.  During this period, he became enamoured with Modern architecture, especially the work of Frank Lloyd Wright.  He, Elizabeth, and son Hayes spent several weeks during 1948 driving around Michigan and Wisconsin, seeking out houses designed by Wright.  He also attended Wright's lectures, and visited Wright's home, Taliesin. His other influences included Edward Durrell Stone, I.M. Pei, and Louis Kahn.

Following graduation, McCarty returned to Knoxville to work as a designer and draftsman for the firm Rutherford and Painter (later Painter and Weeks).  McCarty became a partner in the firm in the mid-1950s. In 1953, McCarty designed a concrete house, sponsored by Southern Cast Stone and published in several national magazines. This led to several new clients involved in post-war medium priced housing, including the National Broadcasting Company, the Hotpoint Company, Union Carbide, Knox Homes, and the Zeckendorf Corporation. During the 1950s and 60s, the firm also designed a number of custom houses, in addition to commercial and public projects such as the Knoxville Civic Auditorium and Coliseum (in joint venture with Morton/Sweetser) and the Humanities Social Sciences Complex at the University of Tennessee.

In 1965, McCarty and Robert Holsaple formed Bruce McCarty and Associates. In the following five years, the firm designed the Mountain View Garages, Broadway Baptist and Westminster Churches, Virgin Islands St. Croix Condominiums, the University of Tennessee Clarence Brown Theatre, and the University of Tennessee Administration Building.

In 1970, McCarty and Associates merged with another Knoxville architectural firm to form McCarty Bullock Church and Holsaple. Partner Robert Church died in 1972 while serving as acting dean of the University of Tennessee School of Architecture, and the firm thus became McCarty Bullock Holsaple (MBH). MBH designed notable buildings such as the Knoxville City-County Building (a joint venture with Lindsay & Maples), and the UT Art and Architecture Building (co-designed by Bruce and Doug McCarty), the latter design chosen in a statewide competition over 53 other submissions.

McCarty was chosen to be the Master Architect for the 1982 World's Fair, and his firm was not only responsible for the projects's overall design, but also designed many of the buildings, including the Tennessee Amphitheater, Holiday Inn, 1982 Convention Center, and the adjacent office building.  Following partner Glenn Bullock's resignation in 1983, Bruce's son, Doug, who had been working with the firm since the mid-1970s, became president, and the firm changed its name to McCarty Holsaple McCarty. Under Doug's leadership, the firm's work over the subsequent two decades included UT's Hodges Library and law school, the 14-story Bank of America Building, the Ijams Nature Center visitor center, and the Knoxville Convention Center.  The firm also oversaw planning for Knoxville's waterfront, and designed expansions for Neyland Stadium and McGhee Tyson Airport. McCarty Holsaple McCarty provided the renovation plans for the Tennessee Theatre, completed in 2006.

Legacy and recognition

In 1965, McCarty helped establish the University of Tennessee's College of Architecture.  The school has since named the auditorium in its Art and Architecture Building for the McCarty family.  McCarty was also instrumental in the establishment of the East Tennessee Community Design Center, which advises communities in the region on appearance and functionality.

Honors
 1959 Certificate of Award for Outstanding Civic Activities from Gulf State AIA
 1964–68 Member of Chamber of Commerce Board (Knoxville TN)
 1964–74 Trustee of Dulin Art Gallery (Knoxville TN)
 1965–70 Board of Metropolitan Planning Commission (Knoxville TN)
 1969 Fellowship in AIA at Convention in Chicago
 1970 President of East Tennessee Chapter AIA
 1970–90 Who's Who in the United States
 1970 Proposes formation of the Community Design Center
 1975 Receives Mayor's Award for Outstanding Support of the Arts
 1975 Firm wins statewide competition for the design of the Art & Architecture Building at the University of Tennessee.  Bruce & Doug McCarty; Co-designers
 1982 McCarty Bullock Holsaple receives Mayor's Award for 1982 World's Fair
 1982 President of Tennessee Society of Architects
 1996 Gold Medal from East Tennessee Chapter AIA
 2000 Volunteer of the Year Award from the University of Tennessee
 2004 Exhibition of the Architecture of Bruce McCarty at the University of Tennessee Ewing Gallery
 2011 Silver Medal from the University of Tennessee Faculty and Tau Sigma Delta of the College of Architecture and Design

Major works

 Designed by Painter, Weeks, and McCarty

 Designed by Bruce McCarty & Associates (1965–1970)

 Designed by McCarty Bullock Church Holsaple (1970–1972) or McCarty Bullock Holsaple (1972–1984)

 Designed by McCarty Holsaple McCarty (1984–present)

See also
Baumann family (architects)
R. F. Graf

References
Notes

External links

 McCarty Holsaple McCarty Architects
 Architectural Excellence: Bruce McCarty's Knoxville Legacy – Knoxville News Sentinel photo gallery

Architects from Tennessee
Modernist architects from the United States
People from South Bend, Indiana
People from Knoxville, Tennessee
1920 births
2013 deaths
Taubman College of Architecture and Urban Planning alumni